Manifesto is a 2015 Australian-German multi-screen film installation written, produced and directed by Julian Rosefeldt. It features Cate Blanchett in 13 different roles performing various manifestos. The film was shot over 12 days in December 2014 in locations in and around Berlin. The film premiered and screened at the Australian Centre for the Moving Image from December 9, 2015, to March 14, 2016. A 90-minute feature version premiered at the Sundance Film Festival in January 2017.

Plot
The film integrates various types of artist manifestos from different time periods with contemporary scenarios. Manifestos are depicted by 13 different characters, among them a school teacher, factory worker, choreographer, punk, newsreader, scientist, puppeteer, widow, and homeless man.

The film consists of 13 segments, each 10:30 minutes long. In each, a character recites parts of manifestos of various political and artistic movements.

Production

Development
Rosefeldt began developing the project through research and analyses of an assortment of textual manifestos, starting from Karl Marx and Friedrich Engels' 1848 The Communist Manifesto and Filippo Tommaso Marinetti's 1909 The Founding and Manifesto of Futurism, the latter his first selection, to film director Jim Jarmusch's "Golden Rules of Filmmaking" (2004), the most modern text referenced. Rosefeldt selected approximately 60 manifestos which he "found to be the most fascinating, and also the most requitable", or chose "because they suited one another." After collating and fragmenting numerous texts, eventually 12 manifesto collages materialized.

Rosefeldt said that the main concept for the project was to have a woman embody the manifestos. He wanted to "make a piece in which a woman performed multiple roles" in an art-based framework.  Rosefeldt and Blanchett had met a few years prior in Berlin, through Thomas Ostermeier, who had collaborated with Rosefeldt in theater. Rosefeldt had discussed with Blanchett her role as Bob Dylan in Todd Haynes' I'm Not There, which influenced the conception of the project. The two met several times to brainstorm and developed the project together.

Rosefeldt described the process of scripting as "very organic"; "I started to play with the texts and to edit, combine and rearrange them into new texts that could be spoken and performed...They are complementing each other in a playful way." He was attracted to the idea of alluding to "a collection of voices, a conversation...[rearranging] these multiple voices into new monologues: again, turning these texts onto themselves." The project "questions the role of the artist in society today", drawing on "the writings of Futurists, Dadaists, Fluxus artists, Situationists and Dogme 95, and the musings of individual artists, architects, dancers and filmmakers." Rosefeldt deems it an "homage to the beauty of artists' manifestos − a manifesto of manifestos". He titled it Manifesto as "the focus in this work is above all on texts, whether by visual artists, filmmakers, writers, performers or architects – and on the poetry of these texts." The project was commissioned by the Australian Centre for the Moving Image, in partnership with Art Gallery of New South Wales, Museum für Gegenwart, Sprengel Museum, and Ruhrtriennale Festival of the Arts. The film was subsidised by the Medienboard Berlin-Brandenburg with €90,000.

Filming
Production on the film began in December 2014, lasting 12 days. The conditions under which the crew and actress worked in the Berlin winter, including the very tight time frame, allowed little room for improvisation. The crew had to "plan the shoot meticulously" as sometimes they had to shoot two roles per day. Filming locations in Berlin included the Friedrichstadt-Palast, Helmholtz-Zentrum Berlin, Teufelsberg, Humboldt University of Berlin, and Technical University of Berlin; in surrounding Brandenburg, filming was located in Rüdersdorf, Brandenburg University of Technology, and the Stahnsdorf Cemetery. A total 130 minutes of footage was shot. Rosefeldt framed Manifesto as "a series of episodes that can be seen separately but that can also be seen together in their entirety, as a choir of difference voices."

Cinematographer Christoph Krauss used the Alexa XT Plus digital camera as his A-camera. Visual effects (VFX) shots were captured in ArriRaw format. Non-VFX sequences shot with the Alexa XT Plus and the Alexa Plus B-camera were recorded in ProRes 4444. Krauss used an additional Phantom Flex camera for two high-speed shots. Krauss said he chose Cooke S4 lenses for the shoot because he likes the "slightly softer skin tones they produce". Cooke S4 lenses were combined with two Angenieux Optimo Zooms, which were used for "longer focal lengths and flexible second unit shots". Krauss aimed for a natural look. "As in almost all of Julian's works, there is enough abstraction through either deceleration in long takes and slow motion, or unnatural perspectives like high top-shots," Krauss said.

Release
The first images of the film were released in April 2015. Manifesto had its world premiere and was exhibited at the Australian Centre for the Moving Image from December 9, 2015 to March 14, 2016. The installation was shown in Berlin at the Museum für Gegenwart, from February 10 to November 6, 2016. The Art Gallery of New South Wales exhibited Manifesto from May 28 to November 13, 2016. The first showing in North America was in December 2016/January 2017 at the Park Avenue Armory in New York City. The Sprengel Museum in Hanover showed it from June 5, 2016, to January 29, 2017. A 94-minute linear version of the film had its world premiere at the 2017 Sundance Film Festival on January 23, 2017. Shortly after, FilmRise acquired U.S. distribution rights to the film, with plans for a release in mid-2017. It is scheduled to be released in the United States on May 10, 2017. It will premiere on Bayerischer Rundfunk channel in 2018.

Reception
Dan Rule of The Sydney Morning Herald said, "The work, and Blanchett's role in it, is a remarkable exploration of cultural and cinematic tropes and expectations, as well as the jarring, dislocating effect of context on content." Blanchett assuming the various roles while "delivering artist manifestos ... spanning Fluxus, Futurism, Dada and more in the process – as if natural dialogue ... is both a confirmation of Blanchett's sheer presence and acumen as an actor and Rosefeldt's shrewdness and intellect as an artist. Manifesto is worth every minute", Rule wrote. Jane Howard of The Daily Review said that Rosefeldt "plays with the tension of bringing distinct thinking together". "Walking into the space", Howard observed, "the screens at first seem to invite solo viewing, time best spent with [characters Blanchett embodies]. But as you enter deeper into the room, the arrangement of the screens shifts and Manifesto increasingly leans into the sound-bleed and an unspoken stand-off between characters ... But always, Rosefelt gives us moments of quiet away from the manifestos". Howard noted that Manifesto also becomes about Blanchett's adeptness as a performer, her performances "traversing class, country and gender". The installation "quite rightly sits as the hero of this exhibition: a mess of words, worlds, contradictions, and synchronicity. Giving yourself over to it, it can do nothing less than overwhelm."

Siobhan Calafiore of The Weekly Review deemed walking into Manifesto "like entering a strange world where you are both lost and found ... The viewer feels as though they have stumbled into each scenario as an unnoticed bystander, thanks to the movement of the camera and surrounding sound." The settings are "oddly familiar, whether it's a situation you recognise or have experienced before, or one you've seen in film." Calafiorie said there is "a beautiful unity" between the scenes, but "one of the most transfixing aspects" is Blanchett's "convincing transformation into completely different characters." Each context "explores a different idea from art and originality to the subconscious and society. Yet each one resonates and moves the viewer in a surprising way." Toby Fehily of The Guardian gave the installation four out of five stars, praising Blanchett's "convincing, almost effortless performances" which overcome the decontextualized manifestos. "But what matters in Manifesto isn't what is said but the way it's said", Fehily considered; "Rosefeldt has found a way to shrinkwrap the ambitious spirit and poetry of these texts into humble everyday actions."

Showings
The installation was also shown in Berlin at the Museum für Gegenwart (at Hamburger Bahnhof), from February 10 to July 10, 2016, the Park Avenue Armory in New York City from December 7, 2016, to January 8, 2017, and at the Musée d'art contemporain de Montréal from November 20, 2018, to January 20, 2019. In 2019, the film was displayed on 13 screens in the Washington D.C.'s Hirshhorn Museum and Sculpture Garden, where it was part of a larger exhibition entitled "Manifesto:Art X Agency".

Notes 
Manifesto was commissioned by the Australian Centre for the Moving Image, in partnership with Art Gallery of New South Wales, Museum für Gegenwart, Sprengel Museum, and Ruhrtriennale Festival of the Arts. It is a coproduction of the Ruhrtriennale, Schiwago Film GmbH, and the Berlin National Gallery, in cooperation with Bayerischer Rundfunk, the Burger Collection Hong Kong, and the Medienboard Berlin-Brandenburg.

References

External links
 
 
 
 Video interview with director Julian Rosefeldt, from ACMI, April 2016
 Video Interview with Rosefeldt, in German, from Bayerischer Rundfunk, December 2014

2015 films
German independent films
Multi-screen film
2010s avant-garde and experimental films
Films shot in Berlin
German nonlinear narrative films
Australian independent films
Australian anthology films
Australian nonlinear narrative films
2015 directorial debut films
English-language German films
2010s English-language films
2010s German films